Kalervo Tuukkanen (14 October 1909 – 12 July 1979) was a Finnish composer. He was born in Mikkeli and died in Helsinki. In 1948 he won a silver medal in the art competitions of the Olympic Games for his Karhunpyynti ("Bear Hunt").

His output consist of six symphonies and several other works.

References

External links
sports-reference.com

1909 births
1979 deaths
Finnish male composers
Olympic silver medalists in art competitions
People from Mikkeli
Medalists at the 1948 Summer Olympics
20th-century male musicians
Olympic competitors in art competitions
20th-century Finnish composers